Mert Örnek (born 12 February 1997) is a Turkish footballer who plays as a right winger for Ankara Demirspor on loan from Iğdır.

International career
He has represented the Turkish Football Federation at the U19 level, and debuted in a 4-3 loss to the Belgium U19s.

References

External links
 
 
 

1997 births
People from Aydın
Living people
Turkish footballers
Turkey youth international footballers
Turkey under-21 international footballers
Association football forwards
Bursaspor footballers
Giresunspor footballers
Balıkesirspor footballers
Yeni Malatyaspor footballers
Ankara Demirspor footballers
Süper Lig players
TFF First League players
TFF Second League players
TFF Third League players